Under the Storm Giant's Castle is an adventure for fantasy role-playing games published by Judges Guild in 1979.

Contents
Under the Storm Giant's Castle is a scenario for high-level characters set in and under a castle in the clouds. It includes new magic items.

Publication history
Under the Storm Giant's Castle was written by Thomas McCloud, with art by Jennell Jaquays, and was published by Judges Guild in 1979 as a 32-page book.

Reception
Don Turnbull reviewed Under the Storm Giant's Castle for White Dwarf #17, and rated it a 5 out of 10. Turnbull commented: "In general, the module is not so closely worked as it might have been and though it provides for an unusual type of adventure in an unusual setting it could have been developed much more".

Reviews
 Different Worlds #6 (Dec 1979)

Notes

References

Judges Guild fantasy role-playing game adventures
Role-playing game supplements introduced in 1979